The Minsaeng Party is a conservative liberal political party in South Korea based in the Honam region.

Political position 
The party has a support base among elderly and socially conservative Christians in the Honam region. The Democratic Peace Party, a former Honam regionalist party, strongly opposed abortion, but Minsaeng Party has no official position on abortion.

On the LGBT issue, MPs expressed their opposition to same-sex marriage, but criticized some of the ruling Democratic Party's hostile tendencies toward LGBT people.

History 
The party was formed on 24 February 2020 by the merger of 3 parties — Bareunmirae Party, New Alternatives and Party for Democracy and Peace. Ten days before, all 3 parties agree to be merged and re-founded as a new party.

Originally, the party was planned to be formed as the Democratic Unified Party on 17 February. However, on the day of the agreement, the Bareunmirae President Sohn Hak-kyu showed his objection. In addition, on 18 February, the National Election Commission did not allow the upcoming party to use the name as it sounds similar to the extra-parliamentary United Democratic Party.

All 3 parties then again signed the agreement after the leaderships of all of them decided to resign on 20 February. On 24 February, 3 parties were finally merged and officially re-founded with the current name.

It lost all seats in the 2020 election.

In the 2021 by-elections, the party President Lee Su-bong contested for the Seoul mayorship. Despite his less supports, he was able to appear on television debates, as Ahn Cheol-soo, who contested under the banner of its predecessor, Bareunmirae Party, received 19.55% 3 years ago. Nevertheless, he received 0.23% and came far behind of Park Young-sun and Oh Se-hoon, and even Huh Kyung-young.

On 19 April 2021, the former party president Kim Jung-hwa made an announcement to quit the party, although she mentioned that she has no willingness to retire from politics.

On 4 May 2021, Lee Su-bong was suspended from the party for a year.

Election results

References

2020 establishments in South Korea
Centre-right parties in Asia
Conservative liberal parties
Conservative parties in South Korea
Democratic parties in South Korea
Political parties established in 2020
Political parties in South Korea
Organizations that oppose LGBT rights
Regionalist parties
Social conservative parties